Nyctemera kinabaluensis is a moth of the family Erebidae first described by Reich in 1932. It is found on Borneo.

References

Nyctemerina
Moths described in 1932